Murder in Yolpalas is a 1955 Turkish drama film directed by Metin Erksan, based on the novel by Halide Edib Adıvar. It stars Uğur Başaran, Altan Karındaş, and Bülent Oran.

References

External links
 
 

Turkish drama films
1955 drama films
1955 films
Films directed by Metin Erksan
Turkish black-and-white films